Shamim Bano (also commonly termed 'Shamim' or 'Bano Begum') (29 July 1920 – 23 October 1984), was a film actress and singer in Indian and Pakistani Cinema. She starred alongside Dilip Kumar in his debut film Jwar Bhata. She was the wife of famed Pakistani film director and producer Anwar Kamal Pasha, and thus daughter-in-law of poet, writer and scholar Hakim Ahmad Shuja.

Early life
Shamim Bano was born in Lahore, British India, in 1920 to a family of Pathan farmers and small landowners later they settled in the Punjab region but her parents sold most of their patrimony and shifted to Lahore and later Bombay (now Mumbai), soon after the end of the First World War.

Career
Shamim was a successful Indian heroine of the 1940s. She was related to legendary actress and singer Khursheed Bano as well as Meena Kumari. She is remembered for her memoriable role as being the co-star of Dilip Kumar in his first film Jwar Bhata (1944).

She started her career in the late 1930s with Vishnu Cine's Baghi (1939). Ranjit Movietone's Armaan (1942) was one of the most popular films of her career. Another milestone of her career was Kishore Sahu's Sindoor (1947), which became quite controversial during its release because it dealt with the topic of Hindu widow remarriage. Mehmaan, Sanyasi and Pehle Aap were other notable films of her career.

After partition in 1947 she migrated to Pakistan and appeared in few Pakistani films including Shahida (1949) where she was paired with Dilip Kumar's younger brother Nasir Khan and Do Ansoo (1950) which became the first hit Urdu film of Pakistan.

Personal life
Shamim married director and producer Anwar Kamal Pasha with whom she had worked in movie Do Ansoo and Anwar was younger then her after her marriage with Kamal she had three children and then bid adieu to her film career and settled in for a marital bliss.

Death
She died at her home in Lahore in 1984.

Filmography

Film

Awards and recognition

Notes

References

External links
 

1920 births
20th-century Indian actresses
Hindi-language singers
20th-century Indian women classical singers
Pakistani classical singers
Indian film actresses
20th-century Indian singers
Pakistani women singers
Punjabi people
Radio personalities from Lahore
Women ghazal singers
Punjabi-language singers
Singers from Lahore
20th-century Pakistani women singers
Pakistani ghazal singers
Nigar Award winners
20th-century Indian women singers
Punjabi women
Actresses in Punjabi cinema
Pashtun singers
1984 deaths
Pakistani film actresses
Pashtun women
Pakistani qawwali singers
Urdu-language singers
Actresses in Hindi cinema
Pakistani radio personalities
Pashto-language singers
20th-century Pakistani actresses
Actresses from Lahore
Actresses in Urdu cinema
People from Lahore